Irving Dover Ravetch (November 14, 1920 – September 19, 2010) was an American screenwriter and film producer who frequently collaborated with his wife Harriet Frank Jr.

Life and career
Ravetch was born to a Jewish family in Newark, New Jersey, the son of Sylvia (Shapiro) and I. Shalom Ravetch, a rabbi. His mother was born in Palestine and his father in the Ukraine. Ravetch was an aspiring playwright when he enrolled at University of California, Los Angeles. Following graduation, he joined the young writer's training program at Metro-Goldwyn-Mayer, where he met Harriet Frank Jr., whom he married in 1946. He gained his first screen credit with Living in a Big Way which was released the following year.

For the next decade, Ravetch worked mostly on Westerns such as Vengeance Valley (1951). With Frank, he approached producer Jerry Wald and proposed they adapt the William Faulkner novel The Hamlet (1940) for the screen. The result was The Long, Hot Summer (1958), which primarily was an original story with one of Faulkner's characters at its center. When Wald greenlighted the film and asked Ravetch to choose a director, he suggested Martin Ritt, whom he knew from the Group Theatre and the Actors Studio in New York City. The Long, Hot Summer proved to be the first of eight projects –  including The Sound and the Fury (1959), Hud (1963), Norma Rae (1979), Murphy's Romance (1985), and Stanley & Iris (1990) – written by Ravetch and Frank and directed by Ritt. Additional screenwriting credits include Home from the Hill (1960), The Dark at the Top of the Stairs (also 1960), The Reivers (1969), The Cowboys (1972), and The Spikes Gang (1974).

Ravetch and Frank were nominated for the Academy Award for Best Adapted Screenplay and won both the New York Film Critics Circle Award for Best Screenplay and the Writers Guild of America Award for Best Adapted Screenplay for Hud. He was a recipient of the Bronze Wrangler for The Cowboys, the Screen Laurel Award, and additional Oscar, WGA, and Golden Globe nominations.

Ravetch died from pneumonia on September 19, 2010.

References

External links

1920 births
2010 deaths
American male screenwriters
Film producers from New Jersey
Jewish American screenwriters
Writers Guild of America Award winners
University of California, Los Angeles alumni
Writers from Newark, New Jersey
Deaths from pneumonia in California
Screenwriters from New Jersey
American people of Ukrainian-Jewish descent
American people of Palestinian-Jewish descent
21st-century American Jews